Scopalostoma nigromaculella is a moth of the Carposinidae family. It is endemic to La Réunion in the Indian Ocean.

References

Carposinidae
Moths described in 2004
Endemic fauna of Réunion
Moths of Réunion